Jon Thomas Hand (born November 13, 1963) is a former professional American football player who was selected by the Indianapolis Colts in the 1st round (4th overall) of the 1986 NFL Draft. A 6' 7", . defensive end from the University of Alabama, Hand played in nine NFL seasons, all with the Colts. During his playing days in Indianapolis, he started 110 of 121 career games. Was named to Pro Football Weekly's All-Rookie Team and led the team in sacks three times in 1988, 1989, and 1991. In 1989 Jon was 7th in the AFC in sacks with 10 and in 1988 he led his team with 5 sacks.

In 1985 at Alabama, Hand had 77 tackles, 7 tackles for losses, 4 broken up passes, 1 sack, 1 interception, a blocked field goal and caused 3 fumbles. He was named  to The Sporting News' 1985 College Football All-America Team.

References

1963 births
Living people
People from Sylacauga, Alabama
Players of American football from Alabama
American football defensive ends
Alabama Crimson Tide football players
Indianapolis Colts players